Caraga State University (formerly Northern Mindanao State Institute of Science and Technology, abbreviated NORMISIST) is a state-owned university in Agusan del Norte, Philippines. Its main campus is in Ampayon, Butuan with an auxiliary campus in Cabadbaran.

On July 27, 2009, the Congress of the Philippines passed into law Republic Act No. 9854 which was signed by President Gloria Macapagal Arroyo on December 16, 2009, fusing together Northern Mindanao State Institute of Science and Technology in Butuan and Northern Mindanao College of Arts, Science and Technology in Cabadbaran into Caraga State University retaining the Butuan branch at its main campus.

History

On February 14, 1920, Proclamation Number 4 was passed by the American governor to the Philippines Francis Burton Harrison, declaring the reservation of a 232-hectare virgin forest land in Barrio Ampayon, in the Municipality of Butuan, province of Agusan as the grounds of the young school.
 	 	 	
The first framework of the school building was laid down in 1937; the development of the school was deferred as the government deviated to giving priority to serve the Manobo cultural minority through the creation of the Bunawan Agricultural High School in Agusan del Sur. At the close of World War II in 1946, the Agusan Agricultural High School was established in the reserved area.

On June 22, 1963, Republic Act 3604 was passed, converting the school into the Northern Mindanao National Agricultural College (NORMINAC). House Bill No. 25 was passed, converting NORMINAC to the Northern Mindanao State Institute of Science and Technology (NORMISIST). The House Bill became Batas Pambansa Blg. 241 when President Ferdinand Marcos signed it into law on November 11, 1982.
 
RA9854, signed on December 16, 2009, by President Gloria Macapagal Arroyo, established the Caraga State University in the region by integrating the Northern Mindanao State Institute of Science and Technology (NORMISIST) of this city and the Northern Mindanao College of Science and Technology (NMCAST) in Cabadbaran, Agusan del Norte with its main campus in Butuan.

Academics
Caraga State University serves the Caraga Region through the delivery of accredited programs and diploma, associate, undergraduate and graduate courses. The university offers undergraduate and graduate degree programs in addition to some technical and vocational courses....

Campuses
The Caraga State University is located along the Phil-Japan Friendship Highway which traverses Butuan, Surigao City, Bayugan, Cabadbaran and the provinces of Agusan del Norte, Agusan del Sur, Surigao del Norte and Surigao del Sur, northeast of Mindanao, south of the Philippines.

The Butuan Campus has an area of 232 hectares, 32 hectares of which is allocated for academic buildings and support facilities, including a gymnasium, while the remaining 200 hectares of land is for production, research and extension projects of the university.

The Cabadbaran Campus is in Cabadbaran of Agusan del Norte, north of Butuan. The Caraga State University - Cabadbaran Campus is in an eight-hectare campus at T. Curato Street. The campus specializes in developing individuals in the fields of Electrical Engineering, Industrial Technology and Education, Information Technology, Hotel and Restaurant Management and Teacher Education.

Colleges in the main campus

College of Engineering and Information Technology
The college building of CEIT can be found along the main avenue of the campus. Built in 1990, it is a two-storey edifice used for computer laboratories, faculty offices and classrooms. The building has a floor area of 480 sq.m. with an average capacity of 200 persons.

College of Education
The CEd is lodged in three buildings: the main college building, the Home Making Building and the Secondary Building. The main college building was built in 1990, a two-storey center of CEd's academic activities where the CEd Accreditation Center and the College Faculty Office are. The building is equipped to support 600 persons.....
......

College of Agricultural Sciences and Natural Resources
The CASNR academic complex is composed of five buildings: the main college building built in 1987 is a two-storey edifice that stands as the seat of CASNR's academic activities. It has a total area of 1,300 sq.m. or 12 classrooms and an average capacity of 720 people. The Farmers' Information and Technology Services (FITS) Center, the Accreditation Office of CASNR, and the two Faculty Offices of the college are in this building.

College of Arts and Sciences
CAS is the service college of the Caraga State University. The building of the college was built in 1975. It has a total floor area of 900 sq.m. and is a single-floor building of 360 persons as average capacity. This building consists of six rooms; two rooms of which are used as the College Faculty Office. The Mathematical and Statistical Computing Center (MSCC) is housed in this building.

Seal and colors
The colors of the university are green, gold yellow, orange and white:

These colors are reflected in the new seal of the university with the design of a balangay boat, a wooden watercraft used by the early settlers and traders from as far as China, Malaysia, Indonesia and other countries to engage trading in Butuan and nearby areas. The torch symbolizes light-giving and vision to those who seek greater knowledge and truth. The field symbolizes the courses in technology, science and related fields. The gear exudes development and progress in the quad functions of Instruction, Research, Extension and Production. The year 1946 indicates when the then state college started its operation in Ampayon, Butuan.

References

External links
www.carsu.edu.ph Official website

Mindanao Association State Colleges and Universities Foundation
State universities and colleges in the Philippines
Universities and colleges in Butuan